Louisville is the largest city in the Commonwealth of Kentucky, sixth-most populous city in the Southeast, and the 28th most-populous city in the United States. Louisville is the historical seat and, since 2003, the nominal seat of Jefferson County, on the Indiana border.

Named after King Louis XVI of France, Louisville was founded in 1778 by George Rogers Clark, making it one of the oldest cities west of the Appalachians. With nearby Falls of the Ohio as the only major obstruction to river traffic between the upper Ohio River and the Gulf of Mexico, the settlement first grew as a portage site. It was the founding city of the Louisville and Nashville Railroad, which grew into a  system across 13 states.

Today, the city is known as the home of boxer Muhammad Ali, the Kentucky Derby, Kentucky Fried Chicken, the University of Louisville and its Cardinals, Louisville Slugger baseball bats, and three of Kentucky's six Fortune 500 companies: Humana, Kindred Healthcare, and Yum! Brands. Muhammad Ali International Airport, Louisville's main commercial airport, hosts UPS's worldwide hub.

Since 2003, Louisville's borders have been the same as those of Jefferson County, after a city-county merger. The official name of this consolidated city-county government is the Louisville/Jefferson County Metro Government, abbreviated to Louisville Metro. Despite the merger and renaming, the term "Jefferson County" continues to be used in some contexts in reference to Louisville Metro, particularly including the incorporated cities outside the "balance" which make up Louisville proper. The city's total consolidated population as of the 2020 census was 782,969. However, the balance total of 633,045 excludes other incorporated places and semiautonomous towns within the county and is the population listed in most sources and national rankings.

The Louisville-Jefferson County, KY-IN Metropolitan Statistical Area (MSA) includes Louisville-Jefferson County and 12 surrounding counties, seven in Kentucky and five in Southern Indiana. As of 2019, the MSA had a population of 1,395,634, ranking 43rd nationally.

History

The history of Louisville spans hundreds of years, and has been influenced by the area's geography and location along the banks of the Ohio River.

Early history and founding

The rapids at the Falls of the Ohio created a barrier to river travel, as a result, settlements grew up at this stopping point. The first European settlement in the vicinity of modern-day Louisville was on Corn Island in 1778 by Col. George Rogers Clark, credited as the founder of Louisville. Several landmarks in the community are named after him.

Two years later, in 1780, the Virginia General Assembly approved the town charter of Louisville. The city was named in honor of King Louis XVI of France, whose soldiers were then aiding Americans in the Revolutionary War. Early residents lived in forts to protect themselves from raids from the local indigenous population, but moved out by the late 1780s. In 1803, explorers Meriwether Lewis and William Clark organized their expedition across America in the town of Clarksville, Indiana at the present-day Falls of the Ohio opposite Louisville, Kentucky.

19th century

The city's early growth was influenced by the fact that river boats had to be unloaded and moved downriver before reaching the falls. By 1828, the population had grown to 7,000 and Louisville became an incorporated city.

Early Louisville was a major shipping port and enslaved African Americans worked in a variety of associated trades. The city was often a point of escape for fugitive slaves to the north, as Indiana was a free state.

During this point in the 1850s, the city was growing and vibrant, but that also came with negativity. It was the center of planning, supplies, recruiting, and transportation for numerous campaigns, especially in the Western Theater. Ethnic tensions rose, and on August 6, 1855, known as "Bloody Monday", Protestant mobs attacked German and Irish Catholic neighborhoods on election day, resulting in 22 deaths and widespread property damage. Then by 1861, the civil war had broken out. During the Civil War, Louisville was a major stronghold of Union forces, which kept Kentucky firmly in the Union. By the end of the war, the city of Louisville itself had not been attacked, although skirmishes and battles, including the battles of Perryville and Corydon, took place nearby. After Reconstruction, returning Confederate veterans largely took political control of the city, leading to the jibe that Louisville joined the Confederacy after the war was over.

The first Kentucky Derby was held on May 17, 1875, at the Louisville Jockey Club track (later renamed Churchill Downs). The Derby was originally shepherded by Meriwether Lewis Clark, Jr., the grandson of William Clark of the Lewis and Clark Expedition, and grandnephew of the city's founder George Rogers Clark. Horse racing had a strong tradition in Kentucky, whose Inner Bluegrass Region had been a center of breeding high-quality livestock throughout the 19th century. Ten thousand spectators watched the first Derby, which Aristides won.

On March 27, 1890, the city was devastated and its downtown nearly destroyed when what scientists now estimate was an F4 tornado tore through as part of the middle Mississippi Valley tornado outbreak. It is estimated that between 74 and 120 people were killed and 200 were injured. The damage cost the city $2.5 million (equivalent to $69 million in 2019). Established in 1896, Neighborhood House Louisville was the first settlement movement house in the state.

20th and 21st centuries

The moniker "Gateway to the South" comes from the large number of African Americans that moved to Louisville during the period of the Great Migration in the beginning of the 20th century. Settling in an area of the city known as Needmore in 1870, it would later be known under the moniker of Little Africa as migration intensified, reaching its height in the 1920s. After urban renewal programs demolished many of the existing neighborhood structures in the 1950s, it came to be known today as the Park DuValle neighborhood.

In 1914, the City of Louisville passed a racially-based residential zoning code, following Baltimore, Atlanta, and a handful of cities in the Carolinas. The NAACP challenged the ordinance in two cases. Two weeks after the ordinance enacted, an African-American named Arthur Harris moved into a house on a block designated for whites. He was prosecuted and found guilty. The second case was planned to create a test case. William Warley, the president of the local chapter of the NAACP, tendered a purchase offer on a white block from Charles Buchanan, a white real estate agent. Warley also wrote a letter declaring his intention to build a house on that lot and reside there. With the understanding that the Louisville ordinance made it illegal for him to live there, Warley withheld payment, setting in motion a breach of contract suit by Buchanan. By 1917 the US Supreme Court agreed to hear the case of Buchanan v. Warley. The court struck down the Louisville residential segregation ordinance, ruling that it violated the Fourteenth Amendment's due process clause.

In 1917, shortly after the United States' entry into World War I, Louisville was selected as the site of Camp Zachary Taylor. Camp Taylor was one of the country's largest World War I training camps. It was home of the 84th Infantry Division and trained over 150,000 men by the end of war, including F. Scott Fitzgerald. The camp was closed in 1921. Many of the buildings and infrastructure in the Camp Taylor neighborhood of Louisville are there as a result of the training camp.

In 1929, Louisville completed the lock and dam in the Falls of the Ohio and the city began referring to itself as "where Northern enterprise and Southern hospitality meet". Between the industrial boom of that year and through the Great Depression, Louisville gained 15,000 new residents, about three percent of them black(450), most fleeing poverty in rural areas.

These events triggered the "Great Flood of 1937", which lasted into early February. The flood submerged 60–70 percent of the city, caused complete loss of power for four days, and forced the evacuation of 175,000 or 230,000 residents, depending on sources. Ninety people died as a result of the flood. It led to dramatic changes in where residents lived. Today, the city is protected by numerous flood walls. After the flood, the areas of high elevation in the eastern part of the city had decades of residential growth.

Louisville was a center for factory war production during World War II. In May 1942, the U.S. government assigned the Curtiss-Wright Aircraft Company, a war plant located at Louisville's air field, for wartime aircraft production. The factory produced the C-46 Commando cargo plane, among other aircraft. In 1946, the factory was sold to International Harvester, which began large-scale production of tractors and agricultural equipment. In 1950, the Census Bureau reported Louisville's population as 84.3% white and 15.6% black.

Throughout the 1940s, there were more black police officers than any other Southern city, though they were allowed to patrol only black districts. This, in part, made Louisville seem like a more racially progressive city than other Southern cities, although only when black citizens accepted a lower status than white citizens. Many historians have referred to this "veil" of segregation as a "polite" racism. Historian George Wright stated that polite racism "often deluded both blacks and well-meaning whites into believing that real progress was being made in their city". For example, in the city Jim Crow practices were not maintained by law so much as by custom.

Similar to many other older American cities, Louisville began to experience a movement of people and businesses to the suburbs in the 1960s and 1970s. Middle class residents used newly built freeways and interstate highways to commute to work, moving into more distant but newer housing. Because of tax laws, businesses found it cheaper to build new rather than renovate older buildings. Economic changes included a decline in local manufacturing. The West End and older areas of the South End, in particular, began to decline economically as many local factories closed.

In 1974, a major (F4) tornado hit Louisville as part of the 1974 Super Outbreak of tornadoes that struck 13 states. It covered  and destroyed several hundred homes in the Louisville area, causing two deaths.

Since the 1980s, many of the city's urban neighborhoods have been revitalized into areas popular with young professionals and college students. The greatest change has occurred along the Bardstown Road/Baxter Avenue and Frankfort Avenue corridors as well as the Old Louisville neighborhood. In recent years, such change has also occurred in the East Market District (NuLu).

Since the late 1990s, Downtown has experienced significant residential, tourist and retail growth, including the addition of major sports complexes KFC Yum! Center, Lynn Family Stadium and Louisville Slugger Field, conversion of waterfront industrial sites into Waterfront Park, openings of varied museums (see Museums, galleries and interpretive centers below), and the refurbishing of the former Galleria into the bustling entertainment complex Fourth Street Live!, which opened in 2004.

On March 13, 2020, four plainclothed officers from Louisville Metro Police Department executed a “no-knock” search warrant which led to the killing of Breonna Taylor, a 26-year-old African-American woman. For months afterward, Taylor’s family, members of the local community, and people around the world protested to demand that officers involved in the shooting be fired and criminally charged. These protests and demonstrations coincided and intertwined with the international George Floyd protests, as well as the Black Lives Matter movement and a broader movement of racial unrest. As a result of the incident, the police chief was fired and four officers received federal charges, but no significant systemic changes were made.

Geography

Louisville is southeasterly situated along the border between Kentucky and Indiana, the Ohio River, in north-central Kentucky at the Falls of the Ohio. Louisville is an Upper South city located in a Southern state that is influenced by both Southern and Midwestern culture. It is sometimes referred to as either one of the northernmost Southern cities or as one of the southernmost Northern cities in the United States.

Louisville is located in Kentucky's outer Bluegrass region. Its development has been influenced by its location on the Ohio River, which spurred Louisville's growth from an isolated camp site into a major shipping port. Much of the city is located on a very wide and flat floodplain surrounded by hill country on all sides. Much of the area was swampland that had to be drained as the city grew. In the 1840s, most creeks were rerouted or placed in canals to prevent flooding and disease outbreaks.

Areas generally east of I-65 are above the flood plain, and are composed of gently rolling hills. The southernmost parts of Jefferson County are in the scenic and largely undeveloped Knobs region, which is home to Jefferson Memorial Forest.

The Louisville-Jefferson County, KY-IN Metropolitan Statistical Area (MSA), the 43rd largest in the United States, includes the Kentucky county of Jefferson (coterminous with Louisville Metro), plus twelve outlying counties—seven in Kentucky and five in Southern Indiana. Louisville's MSA is included in the Louisville–Elizabethtown–Madison, KY–IN Combined Statistical Area (CSA), which also includes the Elizabethtown, KY MSA, as well as the Madison, IN Micropolitan Statistical Area.

The Louisville area is near several other urban areas, especially Frankfort, Kentucky (the state's capital), Cincinnati, Ohio (the two cities' metropolitan statistical areas almost border each other), Lexington, Kentucky, Bowling Green, Kentucky, Nashville, Tennessee, and the Indianapolis, Indiana area (especially Columbus, Indiana, to the north of Southern Indiana).

Cityscape

The downtown business district of Louisville is located immediately south of the Ohio River and southeast of the Falls of the Ohio. Major roads extend outwards from the downtown area in all directions. The industrial sections of town are to the south and west of the airport, while most of the residential areas of the city are to the southwest, south, and east of downtown. In 2010, the 22,000-seat KFC Yum! Center was completed.

Another primary business and industrial district is located in the suburban area east of the city on Hurstbourne Parkway.

Louisville's late 19th- and early 20th-century development was spurred by three large suburban parks built at the edges of the city in 1890.

The city's architecture contains a blend of old and new. The Old Louisville neighborhood is the largest historic preservation district solely featuring Victorian homes and buildings in the United States; it is also the third-largest district containing such architectural distinctions in the United States. The style, which originated in Great Britain, spread to the Commonwealth and eventually to the United States, including the rapidly growing city of Louisville. Many modern skyscrapers are located downtown, as well as older preserved structures, such as the Southern National Bank building. The buildings of West Main Street in downtown Louisville have the largest collection of cast iron facades of anywhere outside of New York's SoHo neighborhood.

Since the mid-20th century, Louisville has in some ways been divided into three sides of town: the West End, the South End, and the East End. In 2003, Bill Dakan, a University of Louisville geography professor, said that the West End, west of 7th Street and north of Algonquin Parkway, is "a euphemism for the African American part of town" although he points out that this belief is not entirely true, and most African Americans no longer live in areas where more than 80% of residents are black. Nevertheless, he says the perception is still strong. The South End has long had a reputation as a white, working-class part of town, while the East End has been seen as middle and upper class.

According to the Greater Louisville Association of Realtors, the area with the lowest median home sales price is west of Interstate 65, in the West and South Ends. The middle range of home sales prices are between Interstates 64 and 65 in the South and East Ends, and the highest median home sales price are north of Interstate 64 in the East End. Immigrants from Southeast Asia tend to settle in the South End, while immigrants from Eastern Europe settle in the East End.

Climate

Louisville has a humid subtropical climate (Köppen Cfa), typical of the Upper South, and is located in USDA plant hardiness zones 6b and 7a. Springlike conditions typically begin in mid-to-late March, summer from mid-to-late-May to late September, with fall in the October–November period. Seasonal extremes in both temperature and precipitation are not uncommon during early spring and late fall; severe weather is not uncommon, with occasional tornado outbreaks in the region. Winter typically brings a mix of rain, sleet, and snow, with occasional heavy snowfall and icing. Summer is typically hazy, hot, and humid with long periods of  temperatures and drought conditions at times. Louisville averages 38 days a year with high temperatures at or above .

The wettest seasons are spring and summer, although rainfall is fairly constant year round. During the winter, particularly in January and February, several days of snow can be expected.

Time zone

Louisville is in the Eastern Time Zone. Some distance to the west, in both Kentucky and Indiana, is the border where the Central Time Zone starts.

Demographics

Between 1970 and 2000, Louisville lost population each decade. As of the 2000 census, Louisville had a population of 256,231, down from the 1990 census population of 269,063. Due to the city-county merger that occurred in 2003, which expanded the city limits, the city's population increased to 597,337 at the 2010 census count.

Louisville is the largest city in Kentucky, with 17.1% of the state's total population as of 2010; the balance's percentage was 13.8%. In 2010, over one-third of the population growth in Kentucky was in Louisville's CSA counties.

The 2007 demographic breakdown for the entire Louisville Metro area was 74.8% white (71.7% non-Hispanic), 22.2% black, 0.6% American Indian, 2.0% Asian, 0.1% Hawaiian or Pacific islander, 1.4% other, and 1.6% multiracial. About 2.9% of the total population was identified as Hispanic of any race. During the same year, the area of premerger Louisville consisted 60.1% white, 35.2% African American, 1.9% Asian, 0.2% American Indian, and 3.0% other, with 2.4% identified as Hispanic of any race.

Of the 287,012 households, 29.6% had children under the age of 18 living with them, 45.2% were married couples living together, 14.7% had a female householder with no husband present, and 36.2% were not families. About 30.5% of all households were made up of individuals, and 10.3% had someone living alone who was 65 years of age or older. The average household size was 2.37 and the average family size was 2.97.

The age distribution is 24.3% under the age of 18, 8.9% from 18 to 24, 30.4% from 25 to 44, 22.8% from 45 to 64, and 13.5% who were 65 years of age or older. The median age was 37 years. For every 100 females, there were 91.60 males. For every 100 females age 18 and over, there were 87.60 males.

The median income for a household in 2017 was $51,960. For non-family households the median income was $32,446, and for family households was $67,965. In 2017, males had a median income of $36,326 while females had a median income of $30,464. The latest available data for per capita income comes from 2006, and was $23,304 for the county. About 9.5% of families and 15.1% of the population were below the poverty line in 2017, including 23.5% of those under age 18 and 8.2% of those ages 65 or over.

Religion

Louisville hosts religious institutions of various faiths, including Christianity, Judaism, Islam, Hinduism, Buddhism, Sikhism and the Baháʼí Faith.

The Cathedral of the Assumption in downtown Louisville is the seat of the Archdiocese of Louisville. Our Lady of Gethsemani Abbey, the monastic home of Catholic writer Thomas Merton, is in nearby Bardstown, Kentucky, and also in the archdiocese. Most of Louisville's Roman Catholic population is of German descent, the result of large-scale 19th-century immigration.

Bellarmine University and Spalding University in Louisville are affiliated with the Roman Catholic Church.

One in three Louisvillians is Southern Baptist, belonging to one of 147 local congregations. This denomination increased in number when large numbers of people moved into Louisville in the early 20th century from rural Kentucky and Tennessee to work in the city's factories; some of these migrants also formed Holiness and Pentecostal churches and Churches of Christ.

German immigrants in the 19th century brought not only a large Catholic population, but also the Lutheran and Evangelical faiths, which are represented today in Louisville by the Evangelical Lutheran Church in America, the Lutheran Church–Missouri Synod, and the United Church of Christ, respectively.

The largest Methodist Church in Kentucky, Christ Church United Methodist, is located in Louisville, and the city has boasted a large Methodist population since the cities founding.

The city is home to two megachurches. Southeast Christian Church, with its main campus in Middletown and three others in the surrounding region, is, the seventh-largest church in the United States. St. Stephen Church is the 38th largest in the US, and has the largest African American congregation in Kentucky.

The city is home to several religious institutions: the Southern Baptist Theological Seminary, Louisville Bible College, Louisville Presbyterian Theological Seminary, and the denominational headquarters of the Presbyterian Church (USA).

The Church of Jesus Christ of Latter-day Saints maintains a temple in suburban Crestwood.

The Jewish population of around 14,500 in the city is served by five synagogues. Most Jewish families emigrated from Eastern Europe at the start of the 20th century; around 800 Soviet Jews have moved to Louisville since 1991. Jewish immigrants founded Jewish Hospital in what was once the center of the city's Jewish district. From 2005 to 2012, Jewish Hospital merged with two Kentucky-based Catholic healthcare systems to form KentuckyOne Health, which later in 2012 announced a partnership with the University of Louisville Hospital. A significant focal point for Louisville's Jewish community is located near Bowman Field, where there are two Orthodox synagogues (including Anshei Sfard, founded in 1893), the Jewish Community Center, Jewish Family and Career Services, and an affordable housing complex.

Since 1996, every May, the Festival of Faiths, a five-day national interfaith gathering, is held featuring music, poetry, film, art and dialogue with internationally renowned spiritual leaders, thinkers and practitioners. The festival is organized by the Center for Interfaith Relations and is held at Actors Theatre of Louisville.

Louisville first welcomed the Baháʼí Faith in 1920. The Spiritual Assembly of the Baháʼí of Louisville was formed in 1944 when their community reached the required amount of nine adult Baháʼís. The first Baháʼí center opened in Louisville in 1967 in Crescent Hill. When the community outgrew the space in 1985, it was sold and another center opened in Buechel in 1998.

Economy

Louisville today is home to dozens of companies and organizations across several industrial classifications. However, the underpinning of the city's economy since its earliest days has been the shipping and cargo industries. Its strategic location at the Falls of the Ohio, as well as its unique position in the central United States (within one day's road travel to 60 percent of the cities in the continental U.S.) make it a practical location for the transfer of cargo along its route to other destinations. The Louisville and Portland Canal and the Louisville and Nashville Railroad were important links in water and rail transportation.

Louisville's importance to the shipping industry continues today with the presence of the Worldport global air-freight hub for UPS at Louisville International Airport. Louisville's location at the crossroads of three major interstate highways (I64, I65, and I71) also contributes to its modern-day strategic importance to the shipping and cargo industry. In addition, the Port of Louisville continues Louisville's river shipping presence at Jefferson Riverport International. As of 2003, Louisville ranks as the seventh-largest inland port in the United States.

Louisville is a significant center of manufacturing, with two major Ford Motor Company plants, and the headquarters and major home appliance factory of GE Appliances (a subsidiary of Haier). The city is also a major center of the American whiskey industry, with about one-third of all bourbon whiskey coming from Louisville. Brown-Forman, one of the major makers of American whiskey, is headquartered in Louisville and operates a distillery in the Louisville suburb of Shively. The current primary distillery site operated by Heaven Hill, called the Bernheim distillery, is also located in Louisville near Brown-Forman's distillery. Other distilleries and related businesses can also be found in neighboring cities in Kentucky, such as Bardstown, Clermont, Lawrenceburg, and Loretto. Similar to the Kentucky Bourbon Trail that links these central Kentucky locations, Louisville offers tourists its own "Urban Bourbon Trail", where people can stop at nearly 20 "area bars and restaurants, all offering at least 50 labels of America's only native spirit".

Not typically known for high tech outside of the previously identified industries, Code Louisville, the city's public–private partnership for teaching people entry level software development skills, received recognition in 2015 from then-President Barack Obama.

Louisville prides itself in its large assortment of small, independent businesses and restaurants, some of which have become known for their ingenuity and creativity. Several major motion pictures have also been filmed in or near Louisville, including The Insider, Goldfinger, Stripes, Lawn Dogs, Elizabethtown, and Secretariat.

Culture

Annual festivals and other events

Louisville is home to many annual cultural events. Perhaps most well known is the Kentucky Derby, held annually during the first Saturday of May. The Derby is preceded by a two-week-long Kentucky Derby Festival, which starts with the annual Thunder Over Louisville, the largest annual fireworks display in North America. The Kentucky Derby Festival also features notable events such as the Pegasus Parade, The Great Steamboat Race, Great Balloon Race, a combined marathon/mini marathon and about seventy events in total. Esquire magazine has called the Kentucky Derby "the biggest party in the south".

Usually beginning in late February or early March is the Humana Festival of New American Plays at Actors Theatre of Louisville, an internationally acclaimed new-play festival that lasts approximately six weeks.

The summer season in Louisville also features a series of cultural events such as the Kentucky Shakespeare Festival (commonly called "Shakespeare in Central Park"), held in July of every year and features free Shakespeare plays in Central Park in Old Louisville.

Also in July, the Forecastle Festival draws 35,000 visitors annually to Louisville Waterfront Park in celebration of the best in music, art and environmental activism. Past performers include The Black Keys, The Flaming Lips, Widespread Panic, The Smashing Pumpkins, The Avett Brothers, The Black Crowes and hundreds more.

The Kentucky State Fair is held every August at the Kentucky Exposition Center in Louisville as well, featuring an array of culture from all areas of Kentucky. In places, the African American community celebrates Juneteenth commemorating June 19, 1865, when enslaved African Americans in the western territories learned of their freedom.

In September, in nearby Bardstown, is the annual Kentucky Bourbon Festival, which celebrates the history and art of distilling bourbon whiskey. The suburb of Jeffersontown is also the home of the annual Gaslight Festival, a series of events spread over a week. Attendance is estimated at 200,000–300,000 for the week.

The month of October features the St. James Court Art Show in Old Louisville. Thousands of artists gather on the streets and in the courtyard to exhibit and sell their wares, and the event is attended by many art collectors and enthusiasts. The show typically brings in a crowd of over 150,000 people and $3 million in sales.

Another art-related event that occurs every month is the First Friday Hop. A free TARC bus takes art lovers to many downtown area (especially East Market District/NuLu) independent art galleries on the first Friday of every month.

Indie scene

Louisville has blossomed as a booming center for independent art, music and business.

A Louisville locale that highlights this scene is Bardstown Road, an area located in the heart of the Highlands. Bardstown Road is known for its cultural diversity and local trade. The majority of the businesses along Bardstown Road, such as coffee shops, clothing stores and art galleries, are locally owned and operated businesses. Though it is only about a mile (1.6 km) long, this strip of Bardstown Road constitutes much of the city's culture and diverse lifestyle, contributing to the unofficial "Keep Louisville Weird" slogan.

In downtown Louisville, 21c Museum Hotel, a hotel that showcases contemporary art installations and exhibitions throughout its public spaces, and features a red penguin on its roof, is, according to The New York Times, "an innovative concept with strong execution and prompt and enthusiastic service".

Louisville is home to a thriving indie music scene with bands such as Love Jones, Tantric, Squirrel Bait, CABIN, Slint, My Morning Jacket, Houndmouth, Young Widows and Wax Fang. Acclaimed singer-songwriters Will Oldham, who performs under the moniker "Bonnie 'Prince' Billy", is a resident, as was country/rock singer-songwriter Tim Krekel. Cellist Ben Sollee splits his time between Louisville and Lexington. Long running rock/jazz fusion band NRBQ also formed in Louisville in the late 1960s as well as 1980s psychobilly band Bodeco. Post-grunge band Days of the New, at one time including future breakout pop star Nicole Scherzinger, formed in Louisville in the mid-1990s. Popular local singer Bryson Tiller paid homage to Louisville is his chart-topping T R A P S O U L with the song "502 Come Up", referencing the city's area code, and rapper Jack Harlow also calls the city home.

The Louisville music scene reaches a crescendo every July during the Forecastle Festival, a three-day music, art and environmental activism festival taking place at Louisville Waterfront Park.

Especially catering to Louisville's music scene is 91.9 WFPK Radio Louisville, a local public radio station funded, in part, from local listeners. The station features not only national and international musicians common to public radio, but also local and regional talent. The station also hosts summer concerts on the waterfront from April until July, where up-and-coming alternative artists are brought to stage.

Museums, galleries and interpretive centers

The West Main District in downtown Louisville features what is locally known as "Museum Row". In this area is the Frazier History Museum, which opened its doors in 2004 as an armaments museum, featuring the only collection of Royal Armouries artifacts outside of the United Kingdom. Since then the Frazier has expanded its focus to broader history. The Frazier Museum has three floors of exhibits, an education center and a tournament ring, which presents daily performances, as well as event spaces available for rent, including a rooftop garden featuring native plants and 4th floor loft-style space that accommodates up to 360 people seated.

Also nearby is the Kentucky Science Center, which is Kentucky's largest hands-on science center and features interactive exhibits, IMAX films, educational programs and technology networks. The Kentucky Museum of Art and Craft, opened in 1981, is a nonprofit organization. The Muhammad Ali Center opened November 2005 in "Museum Row" and features Louisville native Muhammad Ali's boxing memorabilia. 

The National Society of the Sons of the American Revolution (SAR) is a patriotic, historical, and educational non-profit organization and a leading male lineage society that perpetuates the ideals of the American war for independence and the founding of the United States. The SAR opened its National Genealogical Research Library in 2010 along Louisville's Museum Row next door to its national headquarters, with an on-site American Revolutionary War Education Center expected to be completed soon.

The Speed Art Museum opened in 1927 and is the oldest and largest art museum in the state of Kentucky. The museum was closed for three years, re-opening in 2016 with 220,000 sq. ft. of renovations. Located adjacent to the University of Louisville, the museum features over 12,000 pieces of art in its permanent collection and hosts traveling exhibitions. Multiple art galleries are located in the city, but they are especially concentrated in the East Market District (NuLu), immediately to the east of downtown. This row of galleries, plus others in the West Main District, are prominently featured in the monthly First Friday Hop.

Several local history museums can be found in the Louisville area. The most prominent among them is The Filson Historical Society, founded in 1884, which has holdings exceeding 1.5 million manuscript items and over 50,000 volumes in the library. The Filson's extensive collections focus on Kentucky, the Upper South and the Ohio River Valley, and contain a large collection of portraiture and over 10,000 museum artifacts. Other local history museums include the Portland Museum, Historic Locust Grove, Conrad-Caldwell House Museum, the Falls of the Ohio State Park interpretive center (Clarksville, Indiana), Howard Steamboat Museum (Jeffersonville, Indiana) and the Carnegie Center for Art and History (New Albany, Indiana). The Falls interpretive center, part of the Falls of the Ohio National Wildlife Conservation Area, also functions as a natural history museum, covering findings in the nearby exposed Devonian fossil bed.

There are also several historical properties and items of interest in the area, including the Belle of Louisville, the oldest Mississippi-style steamboat in operation in the United States. The United States Marine Hospital of Louisville is considered by the National Park Service to be the best remaining antebellum hospital in the United States. It was designed by Robert Mills, who is best known as the designer of the Washington Monument. Fort Knox, spread out among Bullitt, Hardin and Meade Counties (two of which are in the Louisville metropolitan area), is home to the U.S. Bullion Depository and the General George Patton Museum. The previously mentioned Locust Grove, former home of Louisville Founder George Rogers Clark, portrays life in the early days of the city. Other notable properties include the Farmington Historic Plantation (home of the Speed family), Riverside, The Farnsley-Moremen Landing and the restored Union Station, which opened in 1891. The Louisville area is also home to the Waverly Hills Sanatorium, a turn-of-the-century (20th) hospital that was originally built to accommodate tuberculosis patients, and subsequently has been reported and sensationalized to be haunted. The Little Loomhouse maintains historical records of local spinning and weaving patterns and techniques, and also offers tours, hands-on activities, and professional-level classes and materials.

Performing arts

The Kentucky Center, dedicated in 1983, located in the downtown hotel and entertainment district, features a variety of plays and concerts. This is also the home of the Louisville Ballet, Louisville Orchestra, Bourbon Baroque, StageOne Family Theatre, Kentucky Shakespeare Festival, which operates the oldest professional outdoor Shakespeare festival, and the Kentucky Opera, which is the twelfth oldest opera in the United States.

The Louisville Orchestra was founded in 1937 by conductor Robert Whitney and Charles Farnsley, then Mayor of Louisville, and was a world leader in commissioning and recording contemporary works for orchestra from the 1950s to 1980s. The Louisville Orchestra today performs more than 125 concerts per year with a core of salaried musicians and is recognized as a cornerstone of the Louisville arts community.

Actors Theatre of Louisville, is in the city's urban cultural district and hosts the Humana Festival of New American Plays each spring. It presents approximately six hundred performances of about thirty productions during its year-round season, composed of a diverse array of contemporary and classical fare.

Louisville is home to a fast-growing independent theatre scene. Theatre 502, Savage Rose Classical Theatre, The Bard's Town Theatre Company, The Liminal Playhouse, Looking For Lilith, Bunbury Theatre Company, Louisville Repertory Theatre, Louisville Improvisors, Pandora Productions, Eve Theatre Company, Squallis Puppeteers and Baby Horse Theatre all curate full seasons of contemporary, classical and experimental work.

The Louisville Palace, the official venue for the Louisville Orchestra, is an ornate theatre in downtown Louisville's so-called theatre district. In addition to orchestra performances, the theatre shows films and hosts concerts.

Iroquois Park is the home of the renovated Iroquois Amphitheater, which hosts a variety of musical concerts in a partially covered outdoor setting.

Sports

College sports are popular in the Louisville area. The Louisville Cardinals have competed as members of the Atlantic Coast Conference (ACC), since joining that league in July 2014.

College basketball is particularly popular. The Louisville Cardinals's Freedom Hall averaged sellouts for 10 straight years and the Downtown KFC Yum! Center following suit with regular sellouts. The Cardinals ranked third nationally in attendance in 2012–13, the most recent of the program's three* national championship seasons (1980, 1986, 2013*). The Cardinals also hold the Big East conference women's basketball paid attendance record with nearly 17,000 attending the game against the Kentucky Wildcats in 2008.
The Louisville market has ranked first in ratings for the NCAA men's basketball tournament every year since 1999. The Kentucky Wildcats used to play an annual game in Freedom Hall.

The Louisville Cardinals football team has produced successful NFL players such as Lamar Jackson, Johnny Unitas, Deion Branch, Sam Madison, David Akers, Joe Jacoby, DeVante Parker and Ray Buchanan. The Cardinals won the 1991 Fiesta Bowl, the 2007 Orange Bowl, and the 2013 Sugar Bowl. In 2016, sophomore quarterback Lamar Jackson took the football team to new heights. Lamar was the school's first Heisman Trophy winner, which is awarded to the most outstanding college football player nationwide during that season. He was also one of the youngest players to ever receive the award. The team also matched their highest ranking in school history at No. 3. The University of Louisville baseball team advanced to the College World Series in Omaha in 2007, 2013, 2014, 2017 and 2019 as one of the final eight teams to compete for the national championship.

Horse racing is also a major attraction. Churchill Downs is home to the Kentucky Derby, the largest sporting event in the state, as well as the Kentucky Oaks which together cap the two-week-long Kentucky Derby Festival. Churchill Downs has also hosted the renowned Breeders' Cup on eight occasions, most recently in 2011.

Louisville is also the home of Valhalla Golf Club which hosted the 1996, 2000 and 2014 PGA Championships, the 2004 Senior PGA Championship and the 2008 Ryder Cup. It is also home to David Armstrong Extreme Park (formerly Louisville Extreme Park), which skateboarder Tony Hawk has called one of his top five skate parks.

Louisville has seven professional and semi-professional sports teams, The Louisville Bats are a baseball team playing in the International League as the Triple-A affiliate of the nearby Cincinnati Reds. The team plays at Louisville Slugger Field at the edge of the city's downtown. 

Louisville City FC, a professional soccer team in the second-division USL Championship, began play in 2015 at Slugger Field and has since moved into their own Soccer-specific stadium , Lynn Family Stadium, in 2020. The team was originally the reserve side for Orlando City SC of Major League Soccer, but the two organizations were separated in 2016. Racing Louisville FC, an expansion team in the National Women's Soccer League began play in 2021 at Lynn Family Stadium.

Louisville had two professional American football teams in the National Football League: the Louisville Breckenridges (or Brecks for short) from 1921 to 1924 and the Louisville Colonels in 1926.

Between 1967 and 1976, Louisville was home to the Kentucky Colonels of the American Basketball Association. The Colonels was one of the ABA's most successful teams during its existence, winning four division titles and the 1975 ABA Championship, but was not invited to join the NBA when the two leagues merged in 1976, and subsequently folded.

Louisville has the added distinction of being the only city in the world that is the birthplace of four heavyweight boxing champions: Marvin Hart, Muhammad Ali, Jimmy Ellis and Greg Page.

Current professional teams

Parks and outdoor attractions

Several of these parks were designed by Frederick Law Olmsted, who also designed New York City's Central Park as well as parks, parkways, college campuses and public facilities in many U.S. locations. The Louisville Waterfront Park is prominently located on the banks of the Ohio River near downtown and features large open areas, which often hold free concerts and other festivals. The Big Four Bridge, a former railroad bridge spanning  but is now a pedestrian bridge connecting Waterfront Park with Jeffersonville, Indiana's waterfront park, fully opened in May 2014 with the completion of Jeffersonville's ramp. Cherokee Park, one of the most visited parks in the nation, features a  mixed-use loop and many well-known landscaping and architectural features including the Hogan's Fountain Pavilion. Other notable parks in the system include Iroquois Park, Shawnee Park, Seneca Park and Central Park.

Otter Creek Outdoor Recreation Area, owned and operated by the Kentucky Department of Fish and Wildlife Resources, is another large park in nearby Brandenburg, Kentucky. The park's namesake, Otter Creek, winds along the eastern side of the park. A scenic bend in the Ohio River, which divides Kentucky from Indiana, can be seen from northern overlooks within the park. The park is a mountain biking destination, with trails maintained by a local mountain bike organization.

Other outdoor points of interest in the Louisville area include Cave Hill Cemetery (the burial location of Col. Harland Sanders), Zachary Taylor National Cemetery (the burial location of President Zachary Taylor), the Louisville Zoo and the Falls of the Ohio National Wildlife Conservation Area.

In development is the City of Parks, a project to create a  continuous paved pedestrian and biking trail called the Louisville Loop around Louisville Metro while also adding a large amount of park land.

Government

Until 2015, Louisville was one of two cities in Kentucky designated by the state as first-class (along with Lexington, the state's second-largest). Since January 6, 2003, Louisville has merged its government with that of Jefferson County, forming coterminous borders. Louisville was the second and only other city in the state to merge with its county. (Lexington had merged with Fayette County in 1974.)

Louisville Metro is governed by an executive called the Metro Mayor and a city legislature called the Metro Council. The third and current Metro Mayor is Craig Greenberg (D), who entered office on January 3, 2023.

The Metro Council consists of 26 seats representing districts apportioned by population throughout the city and county. The residents of the semi-independent municipalities within Louisville Metro are apportioned to districts along with all other county residents. Half (13) of the seats come up for reelection every two years. The council is chaired by a Council President, currently David Yates (D), who is elected by the council members annually. Democrats currently have a 17-to-9 majority.

Before merger, under the Kentucky Constitution and statutory law Louisville was designated as a first-class city in regard to local laws affecting public safety, alcohol beverage control, revenue options, and various other matters; as of 2014, it is the only such designated city in the state.

The Official Seal of the City of Louisville, no longer used following the merger, reflected its history and heritage in the fleur-de-lis representing French aid given during the Revolutionary War and the thirteen stars signifying the original colonies. The new Seal of Louisville Metro retains the fleur-de-lis, but has only two stars, one representing the city and the other the county.

Kentucky's 3rd congressional district encompasses most of Louisville Metro, and is represented by Rep. Morgan McGarvey (D). Far eastern portions of the county are part of the 4th congressional district, which is represented by Thomas Massie (R).

Public safety and crime

In a 2005 survey, Morgan Quitno Press ranked Louisville as the seventh safest large city in the United States. The 2006 edition of the survey ranked Louisville eighth.

In 2004, Louisville recorded 70 murders. The numbers for 2005 ranged from 55 to 59 (FBI says 55, LMPD says 59), which was down 16 percent from 2004. In 2006, Louisville-Jefferson County recorded 50 murders, which was significantly lower than previous years. In 2008, Louisville recorded 79 murders.

The Louisville Metro Area's overall violent crime rate was 412.6 per 100,000 residents in 2005. The Elizabethtown, Kentucky Metro Area, which is part of Louisville's Combined Statistical Area, was the 17th safest Metro in the U.S. Kentucky has the 5th lowest violent crime rate out of the 50 states.

In 2020, Louisville recorded 173 murders; and, in 2021, Louisville recorded 188 murders amidst an ongoing violent crime wave in the city.

The city has also been one of the hardest hit by the opioid epidemic. In 2021, Louisville broke the record for overdoses in the city. Heroin, fentanyl and other opioids have also attributed to an overall increase in violent crime, property crime and homelessness in the past decade. 

Violent crime is most concentrated west of downtown, especially in the Russell neighborhood. The West End, located north of Algonquin Parkway and West of 9th Street, had 32 of the city's 79 murders in 2007.

The primary law enforcement agencies are the Louisville Metro Police Department (LMPD) and the Jefferson County Sheriff's Office (JCSO). 911 emergency medical services are provided by the government as Louisville Metro EMS (LMEMS) which responds to over 120,000 calls for service annually. Louisville Metro Department of Corrections operates two facilities housing approximately 2,000 inmates.

Louisville has recently been featured on the television show First 48. The show follows LMPD's homicide unit while they try to solve murders.

Fire protection is provided by 16 independent fire departments working in concert through mutual aid agreements. The only fire department operated by Metro Government is Louisville Fire & Rescue, the successor to the pre-merger Louisville Division of Fire. The city of Shively in western Jefferson County possesses an independent fire department that uses the same dispatch and radio channels as Louisville Fire and Rescue. The other 14 fire departments in Louisville-Jefferson County are run by independent taxing districts, collectively referred to as the Jefferson County Fire Service (JCFS); the county fire service coordinates dispatch, training, and standardization for its member departments.

Education

Louisville is home to several institutions of higher learning. There are six four-year universities, the University of Louisville, Bellarmine University, Boyce College, Spalding University, Sullivan University and Simmons College of Kentucky; Louisville Bible College; a two-year community college, Jefferson Community and Technical College; and several other business or technical schools such as Spencerian College, Strayer University and Sullivan College of Technology and Design. Indiana University Southeast is located across the Ohio River in New Albany, Indiana.

The University of Louisville has had notable achievements including several hand transplants and the world's first self-contained artificial heart transplant.

Two major graduate-professional schools of religion are also located in Louisville. The Southern Baptist Theological Seminary, with more than 5,300 students, is the flagship institution of the Southern Baptist Convention. It was founded in Greenville, South Carolina, in 1859 and moved to Louisville in 1877, occupying its present campus on Lexington Road in 1926. Louisville Presbyterian Theological Seminary, product of a 1901 merger of two predecessor schools founded at Danville, Kentucky in 1853 and in Louisville in 1893, occupied its present campus on Alta Vista Road in 1963.

According to the U.S. Census, of Louisville's population over 25, 21.3% (the national average is 24%) hold a bachelor's degree or higher and 76.1% (80% nationally) have a high school diploma or equivalent.

The public school system, Jefferson County Public Schools, consists of more than 100,000 students in 173 schools. Dupont Manual High School ranks 30th in the nation overall for best high schools, and 13th in best magnet high schools. Due to Louisville's large Catholic population, there are 27 Catholic schools in the city. The Kentucky School for the Blind, for all of Kentucky's blind and visually impaired students, is located on Frankfort Avenue in the Clifton neighborhood.

Media

Louisville's newspaper of record is The Courier-Journal. The alternative paper is the progressive alt-weekly Louisville Eccentric Observer (commonly called 'LEO'), which was founded by 3rd district U.S. Representative John Yarmuth (D).

WAVE 3, an NBC affiliate, was Kentucky's first TV station. Another prominent TV station is ABC affiliate WHAS 11, formerly owned by the Bingham family (who also owned The Courier-Journal), which hosts the regionally notable annual fundraiser, the WHAS Crusade for Children. CBS affiliate WLKY 32 and Fox affiliate WDRB 41 (along with its dual The CW/MyNetworkTV affiliated sister station WBKI 58) round out the major television stations in the city.

The most popular radio stations are WGZB-FM and 84 WHAS 840 AM. The latter was designated by the FCC as a clear-channel station, and was formerly owned by the Binghams (now iHeartMedia), and is a talk radio station that also broadcasts regional sports.

Transportation

As with most American cities, transportation in Louisville is based primarily on automobiles. However, the city traces its foundation to the era where the river was the primary means of transportation, and railroads have been an important part of local industry for over a century. In more recent times, Louisville has become an international hub for air cargo.

Louisville has inner and outer interstate beltways, I264 and I265 respectively. Interstates I64 and I65 pass through Louisville, and I-71 has its southern terminus in Louisville. Since all three of these highways intersect at virtually the same location on the east side of downtown, this spot has become known as "Spaghetti Junction". Three bridges carry I64 and I65 over the Ohio River, and a fourth automobile bridge carries non-interstate traffic, including bicyclists and pedestrians. Immediately east of downtown is the Big Four Bridge, a former railroad bridge that has been renovated into as a pedestrian bridge.

The Ohio River Bridges Project, a plan under consideration for decades to construct two new interstate bridges over the Ohio River to connect Louisville to Indiana, including a reconfiguration of Spaghetti Junction, began construction in 2012. One bridge, the Abraham Lincoln Bridge, is located downtown beside the existing Kennedy Bridge for relief of I65 traffic. The other, named the Lewis and Clark Bridge, connects I265 between the portions located in southeast Clark County, Indiana and northeast Jefferson County, Kentucky (Louisville Metro). Both bridges and corresponding construction were finished in 2016. As with any major project, there have been detractors and possible alternatives; one grassroots organization, 8664.org, has proposed options for downtown revitalization improvements, and a simpler and less expensive roadway design.

Louisville's main airport is the centrally located Louisville International Airport, whose IATA Airport code (SDF) reflects its former name of Standiford Field. The airport is also home to UPS's Worldport global air hub. UPS operates its largest package-handling hub at Louisville International Airport and bases its UPS Airlines division there. Over 4.2 million passengers and over 4.7 billion pounds (2,350,000 t) of cargo pass through the airport each year. It is also the second busiest airport in the United States in terms of cargo traffic, and fourth busiest for such in the world. Only about 35 minutes from Fort Knox, the airport is also a major hub for armed services personnel. The historic but smaller Bowman Field is used mainly for general aviation while nearby Clark Regional Airport is used mostly by private jets.

The McAlpine Locks and Dam is located on the Kentucky side of the Ohio River, near the downtown area. The locks were constructed to allow shipping past the Falls of the Ohio. In 2001 over 55 million tons of commodities passed through the locks.

Public transportation consists mainly of buses run by the Transit Authority of River City (TARC). The city buses serve all parts of downtown Louisville and Jefferson County, as well as Kentucky suburbs in Oldham County, Bullitt County, and the Indiana suburbs of Jeffersonville, Clarksville and New Albany. In addition to regular city buses, transit throughout the downtown hotel and shopping districts is served by a fleet of zero-emissions buses called LouLift. In late 2014, these vehicles replaced the series of motorized trolleys known as the Toonerville II Trolley. A light rail system has been studied and proposed for the city, but no plan was in development as of 2007.

Louisville has historically been a major center for railway traffic. The Louisville and Nashville Railroad was once headquartered here, before it was purchased by CSX Transportation. Today the city is served by two major freight railroads, CSX (with a major classification yard in the southern part of the metro area) and Norfolk Southern. Five major main lines connect Louisville to the rest of the region. Two regional railroads, the Paducah and Louisville Railway and the Louisville and Indiana Railroad, also serve the city. With the discontinuance of the stop in Louisville in 2003 for a more northerly route between New York and Chicago, the Kentucky Cardinal no longer serves the city; it is thus the fifth largest city in the country with no passenger rail service.

In 2016 Walk Score ranked Louisville 43rd "most walkable" of 141 U.S. cities with a population greater than 200,000.

Utilities

Electricity is provided to the Louisville Metro area by Louisville Gas & Electric.
Water is provided by the Louisville Water Company, which provides water to more than 800,000 residents in Louisville as well as parts of Oldham and Bullitt counties. Additionally, they provide wholesale water to the outlying counties of Shelby, Spencer and Nelson.

The Ohio River provides for most of the city's source of drinking water. Water is drawn from the river at two points: the raw water pump station at Zorn Avenue and River Road, and the B.E. Payne Pump Station northeast of Harrods Creek. Water is also obtained from a riverbank infiltration well at the Payne Plant. There are also two water treatment plants serving the Louisville Metro area: The Crescent Hill Treatment Plant and the B.E. Payne Treatment Plant. In June 2008, the Louisville Water Company received the "Best of the Best" award from the American Water Works Association, citing it as the best-tasting drinking water in the country.

Notable people

Events

Important events occurring in the city have included the first large space lighted by Edison's light bulb which occurred during the Southern Exposition. (At the time, in 1883, the largest such installation to date.) Also, Louisville had the first library open to African Americans in the South, and medical advances including the first human hand transplant in 1999 and the first self-contained artificial heart transplant.

Sister cities
Louisville's sister cities are:

 Adapazarı, Turkey
 Jiujiang, China

 Mainz, Germany
 Montpellier, France
 Perm, Russia
 La Plata, Argentina
 Quito, Ecuador
 Tamale, Ghana

In addition, Louisville has been recognized as a "friendship city". The two cities have engaged in many cultural exchange programs, particularly in the fields of nursing and law, and cooperated in several private business developments, including the Frazier History Museum.

Although not technically a sister city, Louisville has friendly and cooperative relations with Chengdu, China.

See also
 List of cities and towns along the Ohio River
 Bloody Monday
 USS Louisville, 4 ships

Notes

References

Further reading

External links

 
 Louisville Metro's Open Data Portal
 Louisville Convention and Visitors Bureau
 
 Louisville/Jefferson County Information Consortium (LOJIC)
 Interactive Maps of Louisville Metro, Jefferson County, KY Interactive Maps of Louisville Metro, Jefferson County, KY
 City Mayors feature: "Louisville Metro has shown other regions how mergers can change balance of power"
 Louisville Life—weekly broadcast on Kentucky Educational Television
 Images of Louisville from the University of Louisville Digital Collections 

 
Cities in Kentucky
County seats in Kentucky
Cities in Jefferson County, Kentucky

Populated places established in 1778
Consolidated city-counties
Kentucky populated places on the Ohio River
1778 establishments in Virginia
Inland port cities and towns of the United States